Treytorrens is a municipality in the district of Broye-Vully in the canton of Vaud in Switzerland.

Geography
Of this area,  or 75.2% is used for agricultural purposes, while  or 20.8% is forested. Of the rest of the land,  or 4.9% is settled (buildings or roads).

Of the built up area, housing and buildings made up 1.6% and transportation infrastructure made up 2.9%.  Out of the forested land, all of the forested land area is covered with heavy forests.  Of the agricultural land, 59.6% is used for growing crops and 15.3% is pastures.

The municipality was part of the Payerne District until it was dissolved on 31 August 2006, and Treytorrens became part of the new district of Broye-Vully.

Coat of arms
The blazon of the municipal coat of arms is Gules, three Fishes nainaint Argent.

Demographics
, 0.9% of the population are resident foreign nationals. Over the last 10 years (1999–2009 ) the population has changed at a rate of 0%. It has changed at a rate of -4.3% due to migration and at a rate of 3.5% due to births and deaths.

Most of the population speaks French (97 or 95.1%), with German being second most common (3 or 2.9%) and Italian being third (1 or 1.0%).

The age distribution of the population is children and teenagers (0–19 years old) make up 18.6% of the population, while adults (20–64 years old) make up 61.8% and seniors (over 64 years old) make up 19.6%.

, there were 38 people who were single and never married in the municipality.  There were 46 married individuals, 7 widows or widowers and 11 individuals who are divorced.

, there were 39 private households in the municipality, and an average of 2.6 persons per household. There were 8 households that consist of only one person and 2 households with five or more people.  Out of a total of 40 households that answered this question, 20.0% were households made up of just one person and there was 1 adult who lived with their parents.  Of the rest of the households, there are 9 married couples without children, 18 married couples with children There was one single parent with a child or children.  There were 2 households that were made up of unrelated people and 1 household that was made up of some sort of institution or another collective housing.

 there were 22 single family homes (or 55.0% of the total) out of a total of 40 inhabited buildings.  There were 5 multi-family buildings (12.5%), along with 12 multi-purpose buildings that were mostly used for housing (30.0%) and 1 other use buildings (commercial or industrial) that also had some housing (2.5%).

, a total of 38 apartments (77.6% of the total) were permanently occupied, while 7 apartments (14.3%) were seasonally occupied and 4 apartments (8.2%) were empty.  , the construction rate of new housing units was 0 new units per 1000 residents. The vacancy rate for the municipality, was 3.92%.

The historical population is given in the following chart:

Heritage sites of national significance

The Swiss Reformed church of Saint-Jean-Baptiste is listed as a Swiss heritage site of national significance.  The entire village of Treytorrens is part of the Inventory of Swiss Heritage Sites.

Politics
In the 2007 federal election the most popular party was the SVP which received 48.66% of the vote.  The next three most popular parties were the FDP (20.13%), the PdA Party (7.52%) and the Green Party (6.24%).  In the federal election, a total of 45 votes were cast, and the voter turnout was 49.5%.

Economy
, Treytorrens had an unemployment rate of 0.8%.  , there were 21 people employed in the primary economic sector and about 9 businesses involved in this sector.  4 people were employed in the secondary sector and there was 1 business in this sector.  No one was employed in the tertiary sector. There were 60 residents of the municipality who were employed in some capacity, of which females made up 36.7% of the workforce.

 the total number of full-time equivalent jobs was 19.  The number of jobs in the primary sector was 15, all of which were in agriculture.  The number of jobs in the secondary sector was 4, all of which were in construction.

, there were 3 workers who commuted into the municipality and 36 workers who commuted away.  The municipality is a net exporter of workers, with about 12.0 workers leaving the municipality for every one entering. Of the working population, 11.7% used public transportation to get to work, and 51.7% used a private car.

Religion
Of the rest of the population, there were 3 individuals (or about 2.94% of the population) who belonged to another Christian church.  8 (or about 7.84% of the population) belonged to no church, are agnostic or atheist, and 2 individuals (or about 1.96% of the population) did not answer the question.

Education
In Treytorrens about 38 or (37.3%) of the population have completed non-mandatory upper secondary education, and 12 or (11.8%) have completed additional higher education (either university or a Fachhochschule).  Of the 12 who completed tertiary schooling, 66.7% were Swiss men, 25.0% were Swiss women.

, there were 18 students in Treytorrens who came from another municipality, while 14 residents attended schools outside the municipality.

References

External links

Profile of the municipality

Cultural property of national significance in the canton of Vaud